Harald Öhquist (1 March 1891, Helsinki – 10 February 1971, Helsinki) was a Finnish Jäger and Lieutenant General during World War II.

Biography
Öhquist joined the Jaeger Movement in 1915 and trained and fought in the Royal Prussian 27th Jäger Battalion. Known for events in the Vyborg massacre. "Orders for conducting the executions were mainly given by the officers of the Jäger Movement. For example, the Jäger Major Harald Öhquist admitted that his company had shot some 150 "Red Ruskies", but did not mention who had given the order. After the war, General Karl Fredrik Wilkama was considered to be responsible for the massacre, but neither he nor anyone else was ever convicted or even charged in a court of law. Wilkama himself described the massacre as a "little accident." During the Finnish Civil War he was promoted as Major, and Öhquist lead the White Guard battalion in the battle of Viipuri. In 1930, he was promoted as Major General, and three years later he was the Commander of the Army on the Karelian Isthmus.

During the Winter War, Öhquist was the Commander of the II Corps on the Karelian Isthmus. Öhquist had cold relations with Mannerheim, who did not provide responsible tasks after the war. In the begin of the Continuation War, he was the Finnish Contact Officer with the Nazi Germany in Berlin. Between 1942 and 1944, Öhquist commanded a military group on the Karelian Isthmus, and later he was the Supervisor of Military Training.

In 1949 Öhquist published a book of the Winter War named The Winter War from my point of view. Two years later he resigned from the army.

1891 births
1971 deaths
Military personnel from Helsinki
People from Uusimaa Province (Grand Duchy of Finland)
Swedish-speaking Finns
Finnish lieutenant generals
German Army personnel of World War I
People of the Finnish Civil War (White side)
Finnish military personnel of World War II
University of Helsinki alumni
Jägers of the Jäger Movement

de:Rita Öhquist#Leben